The Énard River is a tributary of Chibougamau Lake, flowing into the municipalities of Eeyou Istchee James Bay and Chibougamau, in Jamésie, in the administrative region of Nord-du-Québec, in the province of Quebec, in Canada.

The course of this river runs entirely in the townships of Queylus and Obalski.

The Énard River hydrographic slope is accessible via route 167, which serves the west and south side of Chibougamau Lake. This last road links Chibougamau and Saint-Félicien, Quebec. The Canadian National Railway spans the Énard River at the mouth of Inlet Lake.

The surface of the Énard River is usually frozen from the beginning of November to the middle of May, however the safe circulation on the ice is usually from mid-November to mid-April.

Geography

Toponymy 
The toponym Rivière Énard was formalized on July 17, 1970 at the Commission de toponymie du Québec.

References

See also 

Rivers of Nord-du-Québec
Nottaway River drainage basin
Eeyou Istchee James Bay